Alessandro Nista (born 10 July 1965) is a former Italian football goalkeeper. A talented goalkeeper in his youth, he was once thought to be the heir of Walter Zenga for the Italy national team, although he failed to live up to his reputation, despite a successful club career.

Club career
Nista has played with Sorrento, Pisa, Leeds United, Ancona, Parma, and Torino in his career, serving mainly as a backup goalkeeper in later years. With Pisa, Nista won the Serie B title in 1985, and the Mitropa Cup in 1987, also winning the English Football League Second Division Title with Leeds in 1990. With Parma, Nista won a Coppa Italia and an UEFA Cup double in 1999, although he was mainly a reserve behind goalkeepers Giovanni Galli, Luca Bucci, and Gianluigi Buffon during his time at the club. In total, he made 66 career appearances in Serie A, 114 in Serie B, and 3 in Serie C1. Marco van Basten scored both his first and final goals in Serie A against Nista, in 1987 and 1993, respectively.

International career
At international level, Nista also represented the Italy national under-21 football team on 3 occasions in 1988.

Coaching career
Following his retirement in 2001, Nista worked as a goalkeeping coach with his former club, Torino. He later moved to work with Reggina, in 2007, and Grosseto, in 2008, before moving to work at Juventus in 2009, training his former Parma teammate Gianluigi Buffon. He worked as the goalkeeping coach for Serie A side Internazionale between 2010 and 2013. He is currently the goalkeeping coach for Serie A side Napoli.

Honours

Club
Pisa
Serie B: 1984–85
Mitropa Cup: 1987–88

Leeds United
English Football Second Division: 1989–90

Parma
Coppa Italia: 1998–99
UEFA Cup: 1998–99

Torino
Serie B: 2000–01

References

External links
Profile at Lega-Calcio.it

1965 births
Living people
Italian footballers
Italy under-21 international footballers
Serie A players
Serie B players
Serie C players
Pisa S.C. players
Torino F.C. players
Parma Calcio 1913 players
A.C. Ancona players
A.S.D. Sorrento players
Association football goalkeepers
Sportspeople from the Province of Livorno
Footballers from Tuscany